Alfred Lovell Dean (August 24, 1915 – December 21, 1970) was a Major League Baseball pitcher and first baseman. He played for the Philadelphia Athletics from 1936 to 1941 and the Cleveland Indians from 1941 to 1943.

From 1943 to 1946 Dean served in the military during World War II.

References

External links

1915 births
1970 deaths
People from Mount Airy, North Carolina
Major League Baseball pitchers
Major League Baseball first basemen
Philadelphia Athletics players
Cleveland Indians players
Minneapolis Millers (baseball) players
Mount Airy Reds players
Baseball players from North Carolina
United States Army Air Forces personnel of World War II
United States Army Air Forces soldiers